Sporting TV is the television channel of Sporting Clube de Portugal. In open signal, the channel is present in the operators MEO, NOS, Vodafone and Nowo. The channel broadcasts live Sporting games at home in the Academia Sporting and in Pavilhão João Rocha.

Programs

Information Programs

Discussion / Information Programs

Culture / Entertainment Programs

References

External links
 Official Sporting CP website

Sporting CP